Helsinki Wolverines is a Finnish American football club based in Helsinki and was founded in 1995. The clubs Top Men's Team plays in the Vaahteraliiga of the American Football Association of Finland which is the highest ranking level of American football in all of Finland. The league in Finland was established in 1980.

History 

Helsinki Wolverines was founded on 10 October 1995. The team played its first official game in 1996 season of 2nd Division, a third tier american football league in Finland, against the Lahti Jets. The first Wolverines team was mainly made up of former Helsinki Whips players and the first head coach was Jimmy Lawson. In five seasons Wolverines rose from 2nd Division to Vaahteraliiga, the top american football league in Finland. The Wolverines have strong rivalry with other teams from Helsinki: the Roosters and the 69ers. The Wolverines chose their colors, maize and blue, as an homage to the Michigan Wolverines of the University of Michigan.

Helsinki Wolverines took their only Vaahteraliiga (Maple League) title so far in 2011, when they beat Seinäjoki Crocodiles on Sonera Stadium in a close match by a score of 30–27. Stephen Stokes from Wolverines was chosen as the Most Valuable Player of the final.

Club structure

Wolverines' Men's first team plays in Vaahteraliiga (Maple League), the premier league of american football in Finland. Men's second team, Wolverines II, plays in 2nd Division, a third tier league. Men's third team plays in 4th Division, a fifth tier league. Wolverines also have 5 boys' youth teams: U20, U17, U15, U13 and U11.

Women's first team was founded again in 2014 after years of inactivity. The team participates in Women's Finnish Championship Series (Maple League) and has recently won 4 consecutive titles in 2017, 2018, 2019 and 2020. The club also has two cheerleading teams.

Season by season

* denotes promotion
Updated as of season 2020.

See also
 East City Giants
 Helsinki 69ers
 Helsinki Roosters

References

External links
Official website 
Helsinki Wolverines on Facebook
Helsinki Wolverines on Twitter
Vaahteraliiga  

American football teams in Finland
Sports clubs in Helsinki
1995 establishments in Finland
American football teams established in 1995